Thinophilus is a genus of flies in the family Dolichopodidae.

Species
Subgenus Thinophilus Wahlberg, 1844:

Subgenus Parathinophilus Parent, 1932
Thinophilus expolitus (Parent, 1932)
Thinophilus milleri Parent, 1933

Subgenus Schoenophilus Mik, 1878:
Thinophilus acutifacies (Hollis, 1964)
Thinophilus fuscicoxalis Grootaert & Meuffels, 1984
Thinophilus grootaerti Negrobov, Maslova & Selivanova, 2016
Thinophilus hilaris Parent, 1941
Thinophilus pedestris (Lamb, 1909)
Thinophilus pedestris campbellensis (Harrison, 1964)
Thinophilus pedestris pedestris (Lamb, 1909)
Thinophilus splendens Grootaert & Meuffels, 1984
Thinophilus versutus Haliday, 1851

References

Hydrophorinae
Dolichopodidae genera